Iulian Lucian Cristea (born 17 July 1994) is a Romanian professional footballer who plays as a centre-back or a defensive midfielder for Liga I club FCSB.

Club career
After playing over one hundred matches for Gaz Metan Mediaș, in February 2019, Cristea moved to fellow Liga I club FCSB, and subsequently signed a five-year contract with them.

International career
On 10 June 2019, he made a debut in the Romania national football team in a 4–0 win against Malta.

Career statistics

Club

International

Honours
Gaz Metan Mediaș
Liga II: 2015–16

FCSB
Cupa României: 2019–20
Supercupa României runner-up: 2020

Individual
Liga I Team of the Season: 2021–22

References

External links

1994 births
Living people
People from Mediaș
Romanian footballers
Romania under-21 international footballers
Romania international footballers
Association football midfielders
Liga I players
Liga II players
CS Gaz Metan Mediaș players
FC Steaua București players